Capsicum frutescens is a wild chili pepper having genetic proximity to the cultivated pepper Capsicum chinense native to Central and South America. Pepper cultivars of C. frutescens can be annual or short-lived perennial plants. Flowers are white with a greenish white or greenish yellow corolla, and are either insect- or self-pollinated. The plants' berries typically grow erect; ellipsoid-conical to lanceoloid shaped. Fruit typically grows a pale yellow and matures to a bright red, but can also be other colors. C. frutescens has a smaller variety of shapes compared to other Capsicum species. C. frutescens has been bred to produce ornamental strains because of its large quantities of erect peppers growing in colorful ripening patterns.

Cultivars

Capsicum frutescens includes the following cultivars and/or varieties:
Wiri Wiri, from Guyana 
Cabai Rawit, from Indonesia, used in hot Sambal.
Hawaiian pepper
Malagueta pepper
Piri piri, also called African Bird's Eye or African devil
Siling Labuyo, from the Philippines.
Tabasco pepper, used to make Tabasco sauce
Xiao mi la pepper, literally "little rice pepper", from Yunnan province in China.

Origins and distribution

The Capsicum frutescens species likely originated in South or Central America. It spread quickly throughout the tropical and subtropical regions in this area and still grows wild today. Capsicum frutescens is native to Central America and Northern and Western South America. C. frutescens may be related to C. chinense.

Uses

Ethiopia

According to Richard Pankhurst, C. frutescens (known as barbaré) was so important to the national cuisine of Ethiopia, at least as early as the 19th century, "that it was cultivated extensively in the warmer areas wherever the soil was suitable." Although it was grown in every province, barbaré was especially extensive in Yejju, "which supplied much of Showa as well as other neighbouring provinces". He singles out the upper Golima River valley as almost entirely devoted to cultivating this plant, where thousands of acres were devoted to the plant and it was harvested year-round.

India
This pepper is common in eastern and southern India where it grows readily in a favorable climate. It is known locally by various common names.

Philippines
Siling labuyo, the local cultivar of C. frutescens in the Philippines, developed from plants introduced during the Spanish colonial era. The fruits are widely used for making traditional dips (sawsawan), spiced vinegar (like sinamak), and condiments like palapa. They are also commonly added to various dishes. The leaves are also eaten as a leafy vegetable, most notably in the soup dish tinola.

Pests 

Helicoverpa assulta is one of very few insects that can successfully feed on the red pepper because it can tolerate capsaicin.

See also
List of Capsicum cultivars
Capsicum

References

External links
 

Chili peppers
Crops originating from Ecuador
frutescens
Plants described in 1753
Taxa named by Carl Linnaeus